Michael Minnis is an American television soap opera writer.

Positions held
The Bold and the Beautiful
 Co-Head Writer: 2004 - January 21, 2008, April 16, 2008 – present

The Young and the Restless
 Script Writer: 1994 - 2002

Awards and nominations
Daytime Emmy Award
 7 Time Emmy Winner: Win, 1997 Best Writing, "The Young and the Restless",   2000 Best Writing, The Young and the Restless,   2010 Best Writing, "The Bold and the Beautiful",   2013 Best Writing, "The Bold and the Beautiful",  2015 Best Writing, "The Bold and the Beautiful", 2016 Best Writing, "The Bold and the Beautiful," 2019 Best Writing, "The Bold and the Beautiful"
Nomination, 2006 & 2007, Best Writing, The Bold and the Beautiful
Nomination, 1995, 1997-2001, 2003, Best Writing, The Young and the Restless

Writers Guild of America Award
Win, 2002, Best Writing, The Young and the Restless
Nomination, 1999 & 2001, Best Writing, The Young and the Restless

External links

American soap opera writers
American male television writers
Writers Guild of America Award winners
Year of birth missing (living people)
Living people